Bernard James Lee was a Scottish professional footballer who played as a forward in the Football League for Bury and in the Scottish League for Leith Athletic.

Personal life 
Lee served as a private in the Royal Scots during the First World War.

Career statistics

Honours 
Bury

Football League Second Division: 1895–96

References 

English Football League players
Place of death missing
British Army personnel of World War I
Year of death missing
Scottish footballers
Newcastle United F.C. players
Scottish Football League players
1873 births
People from Alloa
Association football inside forwards
Association football outside forwards
Royal Scots soldiers
Leith Athletic F.C. players
Bury F.C. players
Nelson F.C. players
Bo'ness F.C. players
King's Park F.C. players
Brighton & Hove Albion F.C. players
Broxburn United F.C. players
Southern Football League players
Sportspeople from Clackmannanshire